Kain O'Keeffe (born 22 October 1987) is an Australian actor, known for his appearances in Australian television dramas and minor roles in films.

Career
O'Keeffe was born in Sydney, Australia on 22 October 1987. Between 2003-05 O'Keefe filmed two guest appearances in the Seven Network television series All Saints. In 2005, O'Keeffe made his film debut aged fourteen in Swimming Upstream, starring as a Harold Jr. O'Keeffe then secured a regular role Blue Water High as Guy Spender, after previously appearing in a guest role as another character called Ryan. O'Keeffe said that he did not mind filming more than one role in the same series, because he felt the industry was "quite small". He said that he hoped to gain more acting roles from starring in the programme. O'Keeffe also starred in the television pilot of television series Resistance, working alongside Nicholas Hope and Jane Badler. In 2009, it was announced that O'Keeffe had joined the cast of Home and Away playing the role of Brendan Austin as part of the serial's new family. O'Keeffe was working alongside his former Blue Water High colleague, Rebecca Breeds. He also starred in the film I Wish I Were Stephanie V, which went on to win "Best Feature Film" at INDIE FEST USA and gained further distribution in 2011.

ABC later picked up the rights to Resistance and went the programme went into pre-production in 2011, with a planned airdate of late 2012.

Filmography

References

External links
 
 Kain O'Keeffe at RGM Artist Group

Australian male television actors
Living people
1987 births
Australian male child actors